Mariusz Sobczak (born 8 February 1982) is a Paralympic athlete from Poland. He has cerebral palsy and competes in T36 sprint and long jump events. Sobczak first represented Poland at the 2004 Summer Paralympics in Beijing, entering the long jump and 100m sprint, but he failed to achieve a podium finish in either. At the 2012 Summer Paralympics he won a silver medal in the F36 long jump.

As well as his Paralympic success, Sobczak has also medaled at both World and European level, collecting six major international top three finishes.

References

1982 births
Living people
Paralympic athletes of Poland
Athletes (track and field) at the 2004 Summer Paralympics
Athletes (track and field) at the 2012 Summer Paralympics
Paralympic silver medalists for Poland
Medalists at the 2012 Summer Paralympics
People from Zduńska Wola
Paralympic medalists in athletics (track and field)
Polish male long jumpers
20th-century Polish people
21st-century Polish people